Faux is an English alternative rock band formed in Southampton, Hampshire in 2015 by Lee Male on lead vocals and guitar, Luke Gould on bass and James Cross on drums. The band went through a couple of lead guitarists before striking a rapport with producer Daly George while working with him on their first EP at The Ranch in Southampton. Faux's latest Ep (self titled) received praise from Kerrang! and the first single Hot Headed was premiered by Alex Baker on his Fresh Blood show.

Musical style and influence
Faux have cited musical influences including The 1975, Brand New, TTNG and The Hives; leading to them being described as Alternative rock, pop punk and British rock.

Members

Current line-up
Lee Male - Lead Vocals (2015–present), rhythm guitar (2015-2017)
Luke Gould - Bass (2015–present)
James Cross - Drums (2015–present)
Daly George - Guitar (2016–present)
Steve Colver - Guitar (2017–present)

Past members
Daniel Fisher - Guitar (2015-2016)
Kieran Marsh - Guitar (2015)

Discography

EPs
Patterns (2015)
Inhale (2016)
Self Titled (2017)

Singles
"Swimmingly" (2015)
"Inhale" (2016)
"Hot Headed" (2017)
"Body Head" (2018)
"Gods Plan" (2018)

References

English pop punk groups
English indie rock groups
Musical groups established in 2015
Musical groups from Southampton
2015 establishments in England